Skra Bełchatów, competing for sponsorship reasons as PGE Skra Bełchatów and officially called KPS Skra Bełchatów SA, is a professional men's volleyball club based in Bełchatów in central Poland, founded in 1957. They compete in the Polish PlusLiga. Skra Bełchatów is the most successful PlusLiga club based on the total number of league titles (9).

Honours

Domestic
 Polish Championship
Winners (9): 2004–05, 2005–06, 2006–07, 2007–08, 2008–09, 2009–10, 2010–11, 2013–14, 2017–18

 Polish Cup
Winners (7): 2004–05, 2005–06, 2006–07, 2008–09, 2010–11, 2011–12, 2015–16 

 Polish SuperCup
Winners (4): 2012–13, 2014–15, 2017–18, 2018–19

International
 CEV Champions League
Silver (1): 2011–12
Semifinalists (1): 2018–19
Final Four (3): 2007–08, 2009–10, 2014–15

 FIVB Club World Championship
Silver (2): 2009, 2010

European record

Club history

 (Workers Sports Club) Skra was founded in 1930 in Bełchatów. Initially, it was a football club. In 1957, a volleyball section was created although it celebrated its biggest successes during the 21st century. In 1977, the football section was separated from the club and transformed into GKS Bełchatów. In 1994, the club advanced to the 2nd Polish Volleyball League and in 1997 to the 1st League "B" series. In 1999, they were promoted to "A" series, but after a year they fell back down to "B" series again.

In 2001, the club led by Wiesław Czaja was promoted to the highest level of the Polish Volleyball League. In their first season there – 2001/2002 – the team achieved a bronze medal of the Polish Championship, defeating Jastrzębski Węgiel after three matches. During the 2002/2003 season Skra took 6th place in the league, and lost in the second round of the CEV Cup in a match against Russian club Lokomotiv Yekaterinburg.

In 2003 Ireneusz Mazur became a new head coach of the team. During the 2003/2004 season the club was close to achieving its next medal. Skra lost to AZS Częstochowa after five matches. The team was also defeated in the final match of the Polish Cup by Płomień Sosnowiec. It was during the 2004/2005 season that the winning streak for Skra began. The club won its first title of the Polish Champion after three matches with AZS Olsztyn, and also achieved its first Polish Cup after the final match with the same club (3–1). The team repeated that success in the next season, when they won their second title of the Polish Champion in four final matches with Jastrzębski Węgiel, and also the Polish Cup for the second year in a row (winning final match with AZS Częstochowa (3–0)). They lost two matches against the Greek team Iraklis Thessaloniki in the Playoff 6 of the 2005–06 CEV Champions League.

In 2006, Daniel Castellani became the new head coach. Significantly, he is the first coach of the club from outside Poland. He spent three seasons in Bełchatów. During his work PGE Skra won next three titles of the Polish Champion (2007, 2008, 2009) and two Polish Cups (2007, 2009). In 2008 PGE Skra played as a host in the 2007–08 CEV Champions League Final Four held at Hala MOSiR in Łódź. On 29 March 2008 the team lost the semifinal against the Russian club Dynamo Tattransgaz Kazan (2–3). On the next day, PGE Skra players won a bronze medal in a match with the Italian team Sisley Treviso (3–2).

In 2009, Jacek Nawrocki became the new head coach. The first success under his guidance was the silver medal at the 2009 FIVB Club World Championship. At this tournament, after being promoted from Pool B, PGE Skra won their semifinal against Zenit Kazan (3–1), but on 8 November 2009 the Polish club lost the final against Trentino Volley (0–3). Two out of seven individual awards were received by PGE Skra players: Bartosz Kurek was named the Best Scorer, Marcin Możdżonek, the Best Blocker. In 2010, the Polish team was once again chosen as a host of the CEV Champions League Final Four. Skra lost the semifinal against Dynamo Moscow, and won a bronze medal in a match against ACH Volley Bled. Mariusz Wlazły was named the Best Scorer of the Final Four tournament. In the 2009–10 PlusLiga season, the club won its sixth title of the Polish Championship.

PGE Skra won the silver medal at the 2010 FIVB Club World Championship on 21 December. The team once again lost to Trentino Volley (1–3) in the final. During the 2010/2011 season, the Polish club won its seventh title of the Polish Championship and fifth Polish Cup. In the 2010–11 CEV Champions League, the team made it to the Playoff 6 stage where Skra lost to the Russian club Zenit Kazan (2–3, 3–1) in the golden set (11–15).

The first trophy won by Skra in 2012, was the sixth Polish Cup in the history of the club. On 18 March 2012 PGE Skra achieved a silver medal of the 2011–12 CEV Champions League. They won a match against Arkas İzmir in the semifinal, but lost in the final to the Zenit Kazan from Russia in the Final Four held at Atlas Arena in Łódź, Poland. The final match ended controversially, with the Serbian referee Dejan Jovanović not seeing the block of the Russian player, whereby the match ended despite that the audience and all the players saw the touch on a screen. PGE Skra players received three out of eight individual awards. Michał Winiarski was named the Best Receiver, the award for the Best Spiker was received by Bartosz Kurek, and the title of the Most Valuable Player was garnered by the team captain Mariusz Wlazły. In the 2011–12 PlusLiga season, the club lost in the final of the Polish Championship to Asseco Resovia, and achieved silver medals. That defeat ended seven seasons of Skra dominance in PlusLiga. On 18 October, PGE Skra lost the semifinal of the 2012 FIVB Club World Championship with Sada Cruzeiro (2–3). On the next day, the Polish team won a bronze medal in their match with Zenit Kazan (3–2). The opposite Aleksandar Atanasijević was awarded the Best Scorer of the tournament. In the 2012–13 PlusLiga season, the club took fifth place, and was eliminated from the 2012–13 CEV Champions League by Arkas İzmir.

In 2013 a former setter of the club, Miguel Ángel Falasca, returned to the club from Bełchatów, this time as the club's new head coach. During the 2013–14 PlusLiga season PGE Skra competed in the CEV Cup, reaching the semifinal, in which they lost to the Russian club Gubierniya Nizhny Novgorod (2–3, 2–3). On 24 October 2013 one of the players – Stéphane Antiga – signed a contract with the Polish Volleyball Federation and became a new head coach of the Polish national team. For the first time in history of the Polish national team, the current coach was an active player. In the 2013–14 PlusLiga season PGE Skra won its  8th title of the Polish Champion.

On 8 October 2014 PGE Skra as the Polish Champion played against ZAKSA Kędzierzyn-Koźle (winner of the Polish Cup) for the Polish SuperCup. PGE Skra won 3–1 at Arena Poznań in Poznań. Facundo Conte was awarded a title of the Most Valuable Player of the tournament. In the 2014–15 PlusLiga season PGE Skra was playing in the 2014–15 CEV Champions League. They won all the matches in Pool F with a perfect record, winning 18 and losing only 2 sets along the way. In the Playoff 12 Skra beat the Italian club Cucine Lube Treia (3–0) in Macerata and (3–1) at Atlas Arena, Łódź. They advanced to the Playoff 6, where they met with the Italian club Sir Safety Perugia. PGE Skra lost its first match with the Italian team (2–3) and gained 1 point. In a revenge match, on 11 March 2015 at Atlas Arena, Łódź PGE Skra Bełchatów beat Sir Safety Perugia (3–1), gained 3 points and advanced to the Final Four, which was held in Berlin. They played with another Polish team in the competition - Asseco Resovia and for the first time in history two Polish teams were playing in the semifinal of the CEV Champions League Final Four. Skra lost the semifinal to Resovia and the match for third place on the next day to Berlin Recycling Volleys and did not achieve any medal. On 6 May 2015 Skra won a bronze medal of the Polish Championship after winning matches with Jastrzębski Węgiel.

On 7 February 2016 PGE Skra won the Polish Cup (beat ZAKSA Kędzierzyn-Koźle 3–2 in the final). The team received four individual awards: Conte was the Best Receiver, Lisinac was the Best Blocker, Wlazły was the Best Opposite Spiker and Most Valuable Player of the tournament. During the final with ZAKSA, the captain Mariusz Wlazły has been injured during the tie–break. Skra was eliminated from the 2015–16 CEV Champions League in the Playoff 6 by Zenit Kazan (first match 3–2, second 0–3). After the failure, the head coach Miguel Ángel Falasca has been dismissed. The decision was announced on 28 March 2016. The management of Skra also announced that the duties of the head coach to the end of the 2015/16 season were taken over by Falasca's assistant Italian Fabio Storti, but on the next day the club signed a contract with a new head coach – Philippe Blain. On 7 February 2016 PGE Skra won the Polish Cup after beating ZAKSA in the final. In April 2016 the team won a bronze medal of the 2015–16 PlusLiga.

Before the 2016–17 PlusLiga season a few significant changes took place in the line–up. One of the team leaders – Facundo Conte, left the club after 3 years spent in Bełchatów, and in the same time two young Polish players joined the team – Bartosz Bednorz, and Artur Szalpuk. Skra ended the season in 2nd place, reached the final of the Polish Cup, and made its eleventh appearance in the CEV Champions League (defeat with Cucine Lube Civitanova in the Playoff 12) (1–3, 3–2).

With Roberto Piazza at the helm of the team, Michał Winiarski as an assistant coach, Milad Ebadipour (the first Iranian player in PlusLiga) and Grzegorz Łomacz (replaced Nicolás Uriarte), Skra won its 9th Polish Championship. The club took 4th place in the FIVB Club World Championship and lost to Cucine Lube Civitanova in the Playoff 12 of the 2017–18 CEV Champions League (2–3, 0–3). Srećko Lisinac left the team after the season.

The next year was marked with the worst result in the last 16 years – 6th place after the 2018–19 PlusLiga season, but on the other hand a victory in the Polish SuperCup. In the CEV Champions League, Skra once again lost to Cucine Lube Civitanova, this time in the semifinals (0–3, 0–3). After the season, Roberto Piazza was succeeded by a young Polish coach Michał Mieszko Gogol.

In the 2019–20 PlusLiga season, ended prematurely due to COVID–19 pandemic, Bełchatów with 17 victories and 7 defeats, ended the season in 3rd place. The league management decided not to award the clubs with medals. The club's icon, Mariusz Wlazły, announced his departure after 17 years spent playing in Bełchatów. During the transfer period, the club acquired, among others, an American outside hitter Taylor Sander, and Bartosz Filipiak from Trefl Gdańsk. Mateusz Bieniek was sent on loan to Skra from Cucine Lube Civitanova.

Team

As of 2022–23 season

Coaching staff

Players

Retired numbers

Season by season

Former names

See also

References

External links
 Official website 
 Team profile at PlusLiga.pl 
 Team profile at Volleybox.net

Polish volleyball clubs
Sport in Bełchatów
Volleyball clubs established in 1957
1957 establishments in Poland